Acampora is an Italian surname. Notable people with the surname include:

 Anthony Acampora, American electrical engineer
 Gennaro Acampora (born 1994), Italian footballer
 Patricia Acampora (born 1945), American politician

References 

Italian-language surnames